Charlotte Shaw may refer to:

Charlotte Payne-Townshend (1857–1943), Irish political activist in Britain, married to playwright George Bernard Shaw
Death of Charlotte Shaw, British schoolgirl drowing in Dartmoor National Park in 2007